Indira Stefanianna (born Indira Stefanianna Christopherson; December 15, 1946), also credited as Indira Danks and Stefanianna Christopherson, is an American actress and singer of Icelandic heritage, perhaps best known for her role as the original voice of Daphne Blake on Scooby-Doo, Where Are You! during its first (1969) season.

Early life
Christopherson was born and raised in San Francisco, California, the daughter of Lorne Christopherson, who was from Manitoba, and her mother, Hrafnhildur (née Snorradóttir), who was born in Iceland.

She and her mother would sing nursery rhymes together when Christopherson was a little girl, and she aspired to one day become a professional singer and actress. After graduating high school, Christopherson studied voice and piano at the Peninsula Conservatory of Music, and attended two colleges: the College of San Mateo and San Francisco State University.

Career
Christopherson has worked as a character actor, stage actress, and recording artist in addition to her voice work. At the age of 18, she moved to Iceland and had a singing career in several languages. After returning to the United States, she started her stage career by appearing in such productions as The Umbrellas of Cherbourg (directed by Andrei Șerban) at The Public Theater, playing the character of Genevieve, and off-Broadway in Harry Ruby's Songs My Mother Never Sang (directed by Paul Lazarus) and Noo Yawk Tawk (directed by Richmond Shepard), in addition to several film and television roles. She made her television debut in 1967 as that episode's bachelorette on The Dating Game. In 1968, Christopherson was cast as the lead in a film titled Reality, about a girl spending her weekend at a resort. She appeared in the Prince Street Players' musical adaptation of Cinderella in 1972.

She was also the original voice of Daphne Blake on Scooby-Doo, Where Are You! for the first season in 1969 before taking leave to move to New York with her husband, Rabindra Danks. Her replacement for the rest of the series (and various spinoffs and specials in the franchise through 2003) was Heather North. Other voice work included the role of Princess Dawn on Here Comes the Grump, which she performed while also voicing Daphne, additional voices on Captain Caveman and the Teen Angels and providing voiceovers for Scholastic Media in Clifford the Big Red Dog and the series Your Community Changes Every Day (for which she won the DuKane Citizenship Award).

Christopherson is also well known for penning and singing commercial jingles and songs. She sang in the AT&T jingle Reach Out and Touch Someone, with music composed by David Lucas, and won a Clio Award. She sang and wrote the lyrics to the song "Crystal of a Star", along with composer Doug Katsaros, which was used as the closing song for the 1986 film Star Crystal.

Personal life
Christopherson married Rabindra Danks, an artist, on October 24, 1969. During their marriage they worked on albums together. After eleven years of marriage, the couple divorced on October 31, 1980. She has one son named K.C.Katsaros.

Filmography

References

External links

Indira Stefanianna Christopherson and Dean Pitchford in the Public Theatre stage production The Umbrellas of Cherbourg, photo taken by Martha Swope.

1946 births
Living people
American film actresses
American voice actresses
American television actresses
20th-century American actresses
Actresses from San Francisco
American people of Icelandic descent
American people of Canadian descent
American women singers
Hanna-Barbera people
21st-century American women